The Urban (Shahr) International Film Festival held annually in Tehran, Iran by Tasvir Shahr Institute, is supervised by the Tehran Municipality's cultural and artistic organization. the eighth Urban International Film Festival was held from 18 to 22 July 2022 so far.

Official program sections 

 Iranian Cinema Competition
 International Cinema Competition
 Neighborhood Competition
 Iranian Cinema Advertising Competition
 Side Section
 Television Series Competition
 Home Video Series Competition
 Direct-to-video Competition
 Short Film Competition
 Documentary Competition
 Animation Competition

Awards

Iranian Cinema Competition

References

External links 

 
 

Film festivals in Iran
Film festivals held in multiple countries